Kensett may refer to:

John Frederick Kensett, an American artist and engraver
Kensett, Arkansas, United States
Kensett, Iowa, United States

See also 
Kensett Township (disambiguation)